Summit High School may refer to:

Summit High School (Arizona), Phoenix, Arizona
Yellville–Summit High School, Yellville, Arkansas
Summit High School (La Quinta, California), a high school in the Desert Sands Unified School District
Summit High School, an alternative school in the Mount Diablo Unified School District, Concord, California
Summit High School (Fontana, California), Fontana, California
Summit Preparatory Charter High School, Redwood City, California
Summit High School (Frisco, Colorado), Frisco, Colorado
St. Paul Academy and Summit School, St. Paul, Minnesota
Rockwood Summit High School, Fenton, Missouri
Lee's Summit High School, Lee's Summit, Missouri
Lee's Summit North High School, Lee's Summit, Missouri
Lee's Summit West High School, Lee's Summit, Missouri
Summit High School (New Jersey), Summit, New Jersey
Summit High School (Bend, Oregon), Bend, Oregon
Summit High School (South Dakota), a high school in Summit, South Dakota
Summit High School (Tennessee), in Spring Hill, Tennessee
Mansfield Summit High School, Arlington, Texas
North Summit High School, in Coalville, Utah
South Summit High School, in Kamas, Utah

See also
Summit School (disambiguation), multiple schools